Municipalities of Tajikistan are the cities, town, and villages of Tajikistan, most of which are listed in the following pages:
List of cities in Tajikistan (cities with more than 10,000 people in 2006)
List of towns and villages in Tajikistan (municipalities with fewer than 10,000 people in 2006)

Populated places in Tajikistan